Gieckau is a village and a former municipality in the Burgenlandkreis district, in Saxony-Anhalt, Germany. Since 1 January 2010, it is part of the municipality Wethau.

Former municipalities in Saxony-Anhalt
Burgenlandkreis